Mark C. Henrie is President of the Arthur N. Rupe Foundation. He is the former Chief Academic Officer and former Senior Vice-President of the Intercollegiate Studies Institute. He was the editor of the Intercollegiate Review and senior editor of Modern Age.

Biography
He was educated at Dartmouth College, Harvard University, and the University of Cambridge.

He serves as a Visitor of Ralston College and a trustee of the Center for European Renewal. He is also a member of the Philadelphia Society, of the Advisory Council of First Things, and of the Board of Advisors of American Affairs.

He is perhaps best known for his book A Student's Guide to the Core Curriculum. He has, in addition, edited Doomed Bourgeois in Love (essays about the films of Whit Stillman) and Arguing Conservatism, a collection of essays that appeared first in the Intercollegiate Review. The latter volume contains contributions by Robert Bork, Cleanth Brooks, Elizabeth Fox-Genovese, Russell Kirk, Ludwig von Mises, Leo Strauss, Eric Voegelin, and Robert Penn Warren.

Bibliography
 A Student's Guide to the Core Curriculum
 Arguing Conservatism (ed.)
 A Student's Guide to Liberal Learning
 Doomed Bourgeois In Love (ed.)
 The Enduring Edmund Burke (co-author)

References

External links 
 The Intercollegiate Studies Institute
 The Center for European Renewal
 Ralston College
 First Things
 Mark Henrie Russell Kirk and the Conservative Heart
 Mark Henrie on Arguing Conservatism
 Mark Henrie Why Go to College?
 

Academic journal editors
American education writers
Harvard University alumni
Alumni of the University of Cambridge
Dartmouth College alumni
Living people
Year of birth missing (living people)